Justice Durfee may refer to:

Job Durfee (1790–1847), associate justice and chief justice of the Rhode Island Supreme Court
Thomas Durfee (1826–1901), associate justice of the Rhode Island Supreme Court